G.D. Birla Award for Scientific Research is an award instituted in 1991 by the K. K. Birla Foundation in honour of the Indian philanthropist Ghanshyam Das Birla. The award is given to an outstanding scientific research, mostly during the past 5 years, undertaken by an Indian scientist, who is below the age of 50, living and working in India. It carries a cash prize of ₹1.5 lakhs (0.15 million). The award is given every year and is available for all branches of science including medical science, basic and applied.

For the year 2022 it was awarded to Professor Narayan Pradhan for his Outstanding Contribution in the field of MATERIAL SCIENCES

Recipients

See also 

 List of general science and technology awards

References
12. https://www.hindustantimes.com/india-news/narayan-pradhan-selected-for-gd-birla-award-for-scientific-research-101647281852795.html

External links
Home page 
List of recipients

Indian science and technology awards
Indian awards
Awards established in 1991
1991 establishments in India